The 1923 Stanley Cup Finals was contested by the NHL champion Ottawa Senators and the WCHL champion Edmonton Eskimos. The previous WCHL-PCHA playoff format was abandoned, and the Ottawa Senators now had to play first the PCHA champion Vancouver Maroons, followed by the WCHL champion Edmonton Eskimos in the Finals.

This was the last Finals series until the 1983 Stanley Cup Finals to be contested by a team from Edmonton. Both games were played in Vancouver, making this the last Finals until 2020 played entirely at a neutral site (the 1924 and 1925 Finals each featured one neutral site game).

Paths to the Finals
In the NHL playoff, the Senators defeated the Montreal Canadiens in a 2-game total-goal series by a close 3–2 score in the series.

The playoff format of the previous year where the PCHA champion met the WCHL champion prior to playing the NHL champion was abandoned. Therefore, for this year, the PCHA champions were given the chance to play the NHL champion in a best-of-three series. The Senators then defeated Vancouver 3 games to 1 in the semi-finals.

Game summaries
In the first game, Edmonton was leading 1–0, on a goal by Crutchy Morrison, before Lionel Hitchman scored in the third period to tie the game. Duke Keats of Edmonton was awarded a penalty shot during the game, but failed to score. Cy Denneny scored after two minutes of overtime to win the game for the Senators.

In the second game, the Senators got a first-period goal from Harry Broadbent and made it stand to the end of the game, playing six-man defence. The shots were recorded; 21, 14 and 13 for a total of 48 by the Senators, and 25, 18, and 25 for a total of 68 by Edmonton. Several players could not play the whole game, including Eddie Gerard and Georges Boucher. Lionel Hitchman played the game with his broken nose in a plaster. Harry Helman played despite a cut to his face from Frank Nighbor's skates, incurred in practice. Cy Denneny had been cut in the leg by the skate of Vancouver's Smokey Harris. 'Super-sub' King Clancy took a turn in all positions, including goal for Clint Benedict in the third period for two minutes when Benedict was serving a penalty. At the time goalies had to serve their own penalties. This is only time that a player played all six positions in a Stanley Cup Finals game.

Stanley Cup engraving
The 1923 Stanley Cup was presented by the trophy's trustee William Foran. The Senators never did engrave their name on the Cup for their championship season.

It was not until the trophy was redesigned in 1948 that the words "1923 Ottawa Senators" was put onto its then-new collar.

The following Senators players and staff were members of the Stanley Cup winning team.

1922–23 Ottawa Senators

See also
 1922–23 NHL season
 1922–23 Ottawa Senators season
 1922–23 PCHA season
 Pacific Coast Hockey Association
 Western Canada Hockey League

References

 Podnieks, Andrew; Hockey Hall of Fame (2004). Lord Stanley's Cup. Bolton, Ont.: Fenn Pub. pp 12, 50. 

 
Stanley Cup Finals
Stanley
Stan
Western Canada Hockey League postseason
Ottawa Senators (original) games
Stan
March 1923 sports events
Ice hockey competitions in Ottawa
Ice hockey competitions in Edmonton
1923 in Ontario
1920s in Ottawa